Mayya may refer to:
Mayya (song), a Hindi song from the movie Guru
Mayya (rural locality), a rural locality (a selo) in Megino-Kangalassky District of the Sakha Republic, Russia